This is a complete list of awards and nominations for Brian McKnight.

American Music Awards 
The American Music Awards show is an annual major American music awards show.

|-
| 1998 || Anytime || Favorite R&B/Soul Album || 
|}

BET Awards 
The BET Awards were established in 2001 by the Black Entertainment Television network to celebrate African Americans and other minorities in music, acting, sports, and other fields of entertainment over the past year. The awards are presented annually and broadcast live on BET. BET commissioned artist/sculptor and hip hop culture icon Carlos Mare139 Rodriguez to design the award sculpture.

|-
| 2007 || Himself || BET J Cool Like Dat || 
|}

Grammy Awards 
A Grammy Award is an accolade by the National Academy of Recording Arts and Sciences of the United States to recognize outstanding achievement in the music industry. The annual awards ceremony features performances by prominent artists, and some of the awards of more popular interest are presented in a widely viewed televised ceremony. It is the music equivalent to the Emmy Awards for television, and the Academy Awards for film.

|-
| 1994 || "Love Is" (With Vanessa Williams) || Best Pop Collaboration || 
|-
| rowspan="2" | 1999 || "Anytime" || Best Pop Vocal Performance || 
|-
| "The Only One for Me" || Best R&B Male Vocal Performance || 
|-
| rowspan="2" | 2000 || "Back at One" || Best Short-Form Music Video || 
|-
| Back at One || Best R&B Album || 
|-
| rowspan="3" | 2001 || "Coming Back Home" (With Bebe Winans & Joe) || Best R&B Performance by a Duo or Group || }
|-
| "Stay or Let It Go" || Best R&B Male Vocal Performance || 
|-
| "6, 8, 12" || Best Male Pop Vocal Performance || 
|-
| rowspan="5" | 2002 || "Love of My Life" || Best R&B Male Vocal Performance || 
|-
| "Love of My Life" || Best R&B Song || 
|-
| "My Kind of Girl" (With Justin Timberlake) || Best Pop Collaboration with Vocals || 
|-
| "Still" || Best Male Pop Vocal Performance || 
|-
| "Win" || Outstanding Song Written for a Motion Picture of Television Series || 
|-
| 2003 || "All the Way" (With Kenny G) || Best R&B Performance by a Duo or Group || 
|-
| 2004 || "Shoulda, Coulda, Woulda" || Best R&B Male Vocal Performance || 
|-
| 2005 || "What We Do Here" || Best R&B Male Vocal Performance || 
|}

MTV Video Music Awards 
An MTV Video Music Award (commonly abbreviated as a VMA), is an award presented by the cable channel MTV to honor the best in music videos.

|-
| 1998 || "Anytime" || Best R&B Video || 
|-
| 2000 || "Back at One" || Best R&B Video || 
|}

NAACP Image Awards 
An NAACP Image Award is an accolade presented by the American National Association for the Advancement of Colored People to honor outstanding people of color in film, television, music, and literature.

|-
| 2000 || "Back at One" || Outstanding Male Artist || 
|-
| 2001 || "Stay or Let Go" || Outstanding Male Artist || 
|-
| 2002 || Superhero || Outstanding Male Artist || 
|}

Soul Train Music Awards 
The Soul Train Music Awards is an annual award show which previously aired in national television syndication, and honors the best in Black music and entertainment. It is produced by the makers of Soul Train, the program from which it takes its name, and features musical performances by various R&B and hip hop music recording artists interspersed throughout the ceremonies.

|-
| 1999 || Anytime || Best R&B Male Album || 
|-
| rowspan="2" | 2000 || Back at One || Best R&B Male Album || 
|-
| "Back at One" || Best R&B Male Single || 
|-
| 2002 || "Love of My Life" || Best R&B Male Single || 
|}

References 

McKnight, Brian